Melenki is a town and the administrative center of Melenkovsky District in Vladimir Oblast, Russia, located in the Meshchera Lowlands on the banks of the Unzha,  southeast of Vladimir, the administrative center of the oblast. Population:

History
Melenki was founded in the 17th century and was granted town status in 1778.

Administrative and municipal status
Within the framework of administrative divisions, Melenki serves as the administrative center of Melenkovsky District, to which it is directly subordinated. As a municipal division, the town of Melenki is incorporated within Melenkovsky Municipal District as Melenki Urban Settlement.

References

Notes

Sources

Cities and towns in Vladimir Oblast
Melenkovsky Uyezd